Dimokratis (Greek: Δημοκράτης) is a daily regional Greek newspaper, published on the island of Lesbos.

It was founded in 1928 with centrist political alignment by journalist Terpandros Anastasiadis with the support of Georgios Papandreou, MP then of the region.

Sources
Τύπος, ιδιοκτήτες και πολιτική

External links
official site

Greek-language newspapers
Lesbos
Publications established in 1928
1928 establishments in Greece